Michael Anthony Foligno (born January 29, 1959) is a Canadian former professional ice hockey right winger who played in the National Hockey League for fifteen seasons from 1979–80 until 1993–94. He is a scout for the Vegas Golden Knights.

Playing career
Foligno was born in Sudbury, Ontario, but spent his early years in Italy where he took up the sport of soccer, participating as a goalkeeper. When Foligno returned to Canada with his family at the age of 10, he was introduced to hockey.

Foligno was drafted 3rd overall by the Detroit Red Wings in the 1979 NHL Entry Draft. He played 1018 career NHL games, scoring 355 goals and 372 assists for 727 points, while adding 2049 penalty minutes. His best offensive season was the 1985–86 season with the Buffalo Sabres, when he scored 41 goals and 80 points, both career highs. On December 23, 1991, while with the Maple Leafs, he broke his foot while playing against Winnipeg, causing him to miss a majority of the season.

Foligno is perhaps best known for his trademark jump, dubbed the "Foligno Leap", after scoring a goal. Both of his two sons have carried on the tradition of the Foligno Leap. Foligno is also known for the custom helmet he was required to wear throughout his career due to his fontanel not fully developing.

Coaching and management career
Foligno has worked as an assistant coach for the Toronto Maple Leafs, Colorado Avalanche, Anaheim Ducks, and New Jersey Devils. He was previously the general manager of the Sudbury Wolves, and was also the head coach of the club, including the time when both of his sons, Nick and Marcus, played prior to playing in the NHL.

On September 21, 2016, it was announced that Foligno was hired as a scout for the expansion Vegas Golden Knights.

Transactions
December 2, 1981: Traded to the Buffalo Sabres along with Dale McCourt and Brent Peterson in exchange for Danny Gare, Jim Schoenfeld and Derek Smith.
December 17, 1990: Traded to the Toronto Maple Leafs along with Buffalo's 8th round pick in the 1991 Draft (Tomas Kucharcik) in exchange for Brian Curran and Lou Franceschetti.
November 5, 1993: Traded to the Florida Panthers in exchange for cash.

Career statistics

Regular season and playoffs

International

Coaching record

Personal life
Foligno was married to wife Janis until her death in 2009 during his time as coach in Sudbury. They have four children, Cara (teacher in Buffalo and formerly in the Dufferin-Peel Catholic school board, Lisa (lacrosse player at Canisius College), Nick and Marcus.  Nick was drafted in the first round of the 2006 NHL Entry Draft by the Ottawa Senators, made the 2007–08 Senators team and was the captain of the  Columbus Blue Jackets from 2015 until April 11, 2021 when he was traded to the Toronto Maple Leafs, one of Mike's former NHL teams, and signed as a free agent with the Boston Bruins. Marcus was drafted 104th overall in the 2009 NHL Entry Draft by the Buffalo Sabres. Marcus won a silver medal with Team Canada at the 2011 World Junior Ice Hockey Championships and joined the Sabres in the 2011–12 season, and currently plays for the Minnesota Wild.

See also
List of NHL players with 1000 games played
List of NHL players with 2000 career penalty minutes

References

External links

1959 births
Living people
Anaheim Ducks coaches
Buffalo Sabres captains
Buffalo Sabres players
Canadian ice hockey right wingers
Canadian people of Italian descent
Colorado Avalanche coaches
Detroit Red Wings draft picks
Detroit Red Wings players
Florida Panthers players
Hershey Bears coaches
Ice hockey people from Ontario
National Hockey League first-round draft picks
New Jersey Devils coaches
Sportspeople from Greater Sudbury
Sudbury Wolves coaches
Sudbury Wolves players
Toronto Maple Leafs coaches
Toronto Maple Leafs players
Toronto Maple Leafs scouts
Vegas Golden Knights scouts
Canadian ice hockey coaches